The Panther GmbH is a film technical company situated in Aying, Munich which develops and produces professional camera cranes and dollies. For the first ever electro – mechanical Camera dolly to be built,the "Super Panther", Mr. Erich Fitz, the founder of the company, received the Oscar "Scientific & Engineering Award". in the year 1990.

History 

Panther GmbH was founded in 1986 by Erich Fitz and specialized in the production, sales and rental of film equipment. In 1990 Panther and its subsidiary HTG GmbH, which was founded in 1988, moved to Oberhaching. In 1991 two more Rental points opened in Prague and Hamburg. In 1999 Fitz decided, because of the great expansion, to build new premises, which opened in 2001.

In 2008 at the Cinec in Munich, Panther celebrated the 25th anniversary of producing Panther Dollies and presented the 1000th electro–mechanical dolly, which was built in gold for the occasion.

In 2010 Panther developed the Tristar and opened a further Rental point in Berlin. A year later the Fitz family changed their strategy and ended their Rental business as they did not want to be in competition with their customers. Panther Rental Prague was sold to ARRI. In 2012 the Panther Rental points in Munich, Hamburg and Berlin were sold to a subsidiary of Bavaria Studios and Production Services, to complete the strategy changes met in 2011.

Andreas Fitz, son of the company founder Erich Fitz, bought all shares from his family and is now Executive President of the company. Since then the company concentrates on the development and distribution of dollies and cranes

Products 

The company produces film cranes, Dollies, remote controlled swivel and angle setup for cameras, tripods and support for cameras.

Over the years Panther has held many patents for their products and developments.

 Linear column guiding
 Combi – wheels
 “Crab and Steer“ steering gear
 Foldable Dolly
 Fluid heads
 Film objective
 Transport system for camera cranes
 Pedestal
 High-low-turnstile
 Dolly platform system

Panther Prize 
Since 1999 the company Panther GmbH presents during the “International festival of the film high school“ in Munich the “Panther Prize“ for young talent. From a line up of nominated short films the jury from Panther chooses the best film. During the prize award the director of the chosen film receives an award and a voucher for the rental of original Panther-machines for the next film production.

Awards 
 1990 - Oscar: "Scientific and Engineering Award" (A.M.P.A.S.) - for the worldwide first electro-mechanic camera dolly the 2Super Panther"
 1998 - Cinec Award - for the "Evolution Dolly"
 1998 - Golden Frog - "for substantial technical contribution"
 2002 - Cinec Award - for the "Galaxy Crane"
 2006 - Cinec Award - for the "Foxy Advanced Crane"
 2014 - Cinec Award - for the "Precision Levelling Track"

External links 
 Official Website

References 

Film and video technology